Bergambacht is a village and former municipality in the western Netherlands, in the province of South Holland. Since 2015 it has been a part of the municipality of Krimpenerwaard. 

The former municipality included the communities of Ammerstol and Berkenwoude, which were separate municipalities until they merged with Bergambacht in 1985.

Topography

Topographic map of the former municipality of Bergambacht, 2013.

Notable people 
 Wim Kok (1938-2018), trade union leader and politician; Prime Minister of the Netherlands 1994-2002
 Meindert Leerling (1936–2021), journalist and politician

References

External links
Official website

Municipalities of the Netherlands disestablished in 2015
Former municipalities of South Holland
Populated places in South Holland
Krimpenerwaard